Mr. Lucky is the tenth studio album by American rock musician Chris Isaak. The record was released on February 24, 2009 via Wicked Game/Reprise labels.

Track listing

Bonus tracks "I Got It Bad" and "Dream Deferred" were available through ChrisIsaak.com. "She", "Movie Star Is Sleeping", and "Keep the Heartache Real" are available on iTunes and Amazon.com. "Blues Has Found Us" is available exclusively on iTunes.

Personnel

Musicians
Chris Isaak – lead vocals, rhythm guitar, bass guitar, acoustic guitar

Artwork
 Chris Isaak - artwork
 Stephen Walker – art direction and album design
 Matt Coonrod – design
 Neal Preston – photography

Additional Musicians
Scott Plunkett – keyboards
Kenney Dale Johnson – drums
Nick Lashley, John Shanks, Greg Leisz, Brian MacLeod, Stuart Mathis, Jamie Muhoberac, Lee Thornburg. Waddy Wachtel, Patrick Warren, Bruce Watson – additional personnel
	

Production
 Eric Rosse, Chris Isaak, John Shanks, Mark Needham – producers
 Will Brierre, Chris Reynolds, Rafael Serrano, Chad Carlson, Aaron Kasdorf, & Howard Christopher Willing – engineers
 Mark Needham – mixing
 Stephen Marcussen - mastering at Marcussen Mastering
 Brian Gardner – mastering on tracks: 2, 11, 12

Management
Howard Kaufman & Sheryl Louis – management for HK Management Group

Charts

References

2009 albums
Chris Isaak albums
Albums produced by Eric Rosse
Albums produced by John Shanks
Reprise Records albums